Kelly Jane Shirley (born 11 July 1981), known professionally as Kellie Shirley is an English actress who works in film, television, theatre and radio. She hails from Croydon via a large Northern Irish family. She has also co-presented programmes for BBC2 and Channel 5. She is known for her role as Kirsty De La Croix in Sky One comedy series In the Long Run created by Idris Elba. She is also perhaps best known for the role of Carly Wicks in the BBC soap opera EastEnders. She returned to the soap in September 2012 for a short dramatic storyline. Other notable credits include The Office and the feature films King of Thieves and Wimbledon.

Career
Kellie was selected by BAFTA to be part of their BAFTA Elevate 2020/21 programme which supports working-class talent and underrepresented groups on screen. She started her career via the National Youth Theatre and B.R.I.T school. Her recent credits include: three series of comedy in the Long Run for Sky One, Death in Paradise, Call the Midwife, BBC, Children’s series Biff and Chip and the BAFTA-winning and Emmy nominated series Joe all Alone and mini series The Marriage of Reason and Squalor for Sky Arts.

She played "Mable" in Dr Jekyll and Mr Hyde (Working Title), "Kym" in The Office Christmas specials and "Violet" in BBC 4 mini series Twenty Thousand Streets Under the Sky soon after graduating.

Kellie co-hosted the BBC Two show Something for the Weekend with Tim Lovejoy, standing in for Amanda Hamilton who was on maternity leave. Kellie has since appeared regularly on Sunday Brunch and on magazine show The Wright Stuff she is now a regular on Matthew Wright’s show on Talk Radio. She featured in the "Pencil Full of Lead" video by Scottish singer Paolo Nutini.

For film she can next be seen as "Cheryl" in British feature film Bull and as "Millicent" in Terence Davies' film Benediction. She played the role of "Terri Robinson" in King of Thieves for Studio Canal and Working Title film. The central role of "Louise" for Lionsgate in their feature film Riot about the London Riots and Susie Browning in Run for Your Wife alongside Judi Dench and Danny Dyer. In the film Girl on a Bicycle, directed by Jeremy Leven, Kellie plays 'Marta' opposite Paddy Considine.  She played Ali in the independent film Everyone's Going to Die The film won a Dinard award.

Kellie played the central role of "Lydia" in the six-part series Self Centered for Pollibee Pictures produced by Kevin Proctor.

For theatre she played "Stella Stone" in Royal National Theatre State of the Nation play about the phone hacking scandal Great Britain directed by Nick Hytner. This was after finishing a lengthy run in the West End at The Theatre Royal Haymarket in One Man, Two Guvnors as "Pauline" after its international tour clocking up over 700 performances.  Kellie has also worked at the RSC, Royal National Theatre and Royal Court Theatre.

Kellie has worked extensively for BBC Radio 4, including three series of comedy House on Fire written by Chris Sussmann and long running series A Small Town Murder.

Kellie has been nominated three times for celebrity supporter of the year. She won it in 2019 for raising awareness for new Mother’s to consider donating cord blood (which doesn’t harm the mother or baby and gives someone with blood cancer a second chance at life.) She is ambassador for the charities Anthony Nolan and Mencap. She is also youth group patron for the charity Magpie Dance.

Personal life

In January 2019 it was announced that she would be running the London Marathon with other former EastEnders actors for a Dementia campaign in honour of Barbara Windsor.

She has girl/boy twins who were born in late Summer 2015.

Filmography

Ridley (ITV) - Denise
Meet the Richardsons (ITV Studios - series 3 - 2021) - Jean
Death in Paradise (BBC One 2021) - Pamela Bellman 
Benediction (Emu Films, 2021) - Millicent 
Bull (Signature Films/Tea Shop productions 2021) - Cheryl. 
Biff and Chip, series 1-3 (BBC iPlayer/CBBC) - ‘Mum’ - Mrs Robinson.
Merry Christmas Everyone (Music Video) -  Herself
In the Long Run (TV series & Christmas Special; 2018–2020) - Kirsty De La Croix
Call The Midwife (TV series 2018–2019) - Connie 
Rock With Rudolph (Music Video) - Herself
Snapshots (Short film 2018) - Marie 
King of Thieves (Feature Film 2018) - Terri Robinson 
Who’s The Daddy (TV Pilot 2018) - Rachel
Ivy (Short film 2018) - Ivy 
In The Long Run (TV series 2018) - Kirsty De La Croix
The Wright Stuff (TV 2018) - Herself 
Sunday Brunch (TV 2018) - Herself 
Joe All Alone (TV series 2018) - Stacey 
Doctors (TV series 2016) 
The Marriage of Reason and Squalor (TV series 2015) 
Shame The Devil (film 2013) – DS Clarke 
 Kick (film 2012) – Tracey
 Everyone's Going to Die (film 2013) – Ali
RIOT  (film 2012) – Louise 
Run for Your Wife – Susie (2012)
Tangled up in Love – Bride (2011)
Frank – Polly (2011)
Girl on a Bicycle – Marta (2012)
Self Centred (web series) – Lydia (2010)
"Pencil Full of Lead" (music video) (2010)
Lewis – Madeleine Cotton (2009)
Something for the Weekend – herself (2009)
Parents of the Band – Esther (2008)
The Grind – Jo (2008)
EastEnders – Carly Wicks (2006–2008, 2012)
The Sick House – Joolz (2007)
Venus – Royal Court Actress #1 (2006)
Coming Up (TV series) – Happy $lapz – Lisa (2006)
Murder City – Episode 'Wives And Lovers' as Lucy Chalmers (2006)
Kellogg's Crunchy Nut Cornflakes (2005) Promotion Girl (Advert)
Too Much Too Young – Mandy (2005)
Heidi – Tinette (2005)
Twenty Thousand Streets Under the Sky – Violet (2005)
Wimbledon – Betting Shop Girl (2004)
The Office – Christmas Special – Blind Date KYM (Contestant) (2003)
The Bill – Alanah 2003- murdered prostitute 2 episodes
Whacked – Waitress (2002)
Smallpox 2002: Silent Weapon – Trish Cooper (2002)
Dr Jekyll and Mr Hyde – Mabel Mercer (2002)

References

External links
 Kellie Shirley

 Interview with Kellie Shirley

Alumni of the Webber Douglas Academy of Dramatic Art
English soap opera actresses
Living people
People educated at the BRIT School
1981 births